Narodni Sin, also known as the Czech National Hall, is located on 209-211 E. Vandalia Street, Edwardsville, Illinois.  Narodni Sin was built in 1906 using funds provided by the Czechoslovak Protective Society after they outgrew their original meeting hall.  The building supported the society's cultural and physical fitness activities.  They sold the building in 1971 to the builder's granddaughter who refurbished it and leased it for commercial use.

The building was listed on the National Register of Historic Places in 2002. It currently houses a paintball supply shop.

References

Czech-American culture in Illinois
Czech-Slovak Protective Society
Edwardsville, Illinois
National Register of Historic Places in Madison County, Illinois
Clubhouses on the National Register of Historic Places in Illinois
1906 establishments in Illinois
Buildings and structures completed in 1906